Vytenis Jasikevičius (born November 21, 1985) is a former Lithuanian professional basketball player, who last played for Žalgiris-2 Kaunas of National Basketball League. Standing at 1.87 m (6 ft 1.5 in), he plays at the point guard position.

Personal life
He is the younger brother of the EuroLeague Legend and Lithuanian basketball star Šarūnas Jasikevičius.

On 15 July 2008, Vytenis married Monika Gidraitė.

References

1985 births
Living people
BC Žalgiris players
Point guards
Basketball players from Kaunas
Universiade medalists in basketball
Lithuanian men's basketball players
Universiade gold medalists for Lithuania
Medalists at the 2007 Summer Universiade